History of Violence (French: Histoire de la violence)  is the second novel by French writer Édouard Louis. It was first published in French by Seuil in January, 2016. In 2020, it was shortlisted for the International Dublin Literary Award.

Background
The novel is based on a real incident that occurred on Christmas Eve, 2012.

Synopsis
Told in first-person narration, the novel presents its events in a nonlinear format. The narrator, Édouard, recounts a sexual encounter in Paris on Christmas Eve. The encounter culminates in a violent rape and robbery. Édouard subsequently reports the crime to the police, which causes him more trauma. On a visit home, he overhears his sister and her husband discussing the details of the assault in detail.

Translations
History of Violence has been translated into English by Lorin Stein. This translation was published in hardcover by Macmillan in June, 2018, and in the United Kingdom in 2019 by Harvill Secker.

Adaptations
A stage adaptation of History of Violence premiered in November, 2019, at St. Ann's Warehouse. The German-language production was directed by Thomas Ostermeier; Louis, who was already a big fan of Ostermeier, co-wrote the adaptation with the director and Florian Borchmeyer and was closely involved in the staging of the play. The production starred Laurenz Laufenberg as Édouard, Renato Schuch as Reda, Alina Stiegler as Édouard's sister Clara, and Christoph Gawenda as Clara's husband.

References

Sources

2016 French novels
Autobiographical novels
New Year novels
Nonlinear narrative novels
Novels about rape
First-person narrative novels
Éditions du Seuil books